John Bowyer (before 1504-before 1555) was an English landowner, administrator, and politician who was MP in the Parliament of England for the constituency of Steyning in 1542.

References

15th-century births
1555 deaths
English MPs 1542–1544
People from Petworth